The 2013 Shoot Out (officially the 2013 Betfair Snooker Shoot Out) was a professional non-ranking snooker tournament that took place between 25 and 27 January 2013 at the Circus Arena in Blackpool, England. It was played under a variation of the standard rules of snooker.

Barry Hawkins was the defending champion, but he lost 38–58 against Stephen Maguire in the quarter-finals.

Martin Gould won the final 1–0 (104–0) against Mark Allen.

Prize fund
The breakdown of prize money for this year is shown below: 
Winner: £32,000
Runner-up: £16,000
Semi-finals: £8,000
Quarter-finals: £4,000
Last 16: £2,000
Last 32: £1,000
Last 64: £500
Highest break: £2,000
Total: £130,000

Draw
The draw for round 1 was made on 9 November 2012 and was broadcast live by Talksport. The draw for each round including the semi-finals was random, conducted live at the venue. The shot clock was reduced from 20 to 15 seconds per shot for the first 5 minutes and from 15 to 10 seconds for the last 5 minutes. There has been only one century break in the tournament. Mark Selby compiled a 125 break against Ken Doherty in round 1. All times are UTC.

Top half

Bottom half

Final

Century breaks 

 125  Mark Selby

References

2013
Snooker Shoot-Out
Snooker Shoot-Out
Sport in Blackpool
Snooker Shoot-Out